Juscelino Kubitschek Bridge, commonly called Ponte JK, is a steel and concrete arch bridge across Lake Paranoá in Brasília, Brazil. It connects the eastern shore of the lake – where Lago Sul, Paranoá and Brasília International Airport are located – to Brasília's city center, via the Monumental Axis. Opened to traffic on December 15, 2002, its distinctive silhouette quickly became a Brasília landmark.

The bridge is named after President Juscelino Kubitschek, who served from 1956 to 1961, and is generally considered the main figure supporting the construction of the planned city of Brasília. It was designed by architect Alexandre Chan and structural engineer Mário Vila Verde.

Description
The main span structure has four supporting pillars standing on the Lake Paranoá lakebed; and the deck weight is supported by three  asymmetrical steel arches that crisscross diagonally. The decks are suspended by steel cables alternating at each side of the deck, interlacing in a twisted plane. The bridge has a pedestrian walkway and is accessible to pedestrians and bicyclists.

Awards
Alexandre Chan received the Gustav Lindenthal Medal for the bridge's project at the 2003 International Bridge Conference in Pittsburgh. This medal is awarded "for a single, recent outstanding achievement showing harmony with the environment, aesthetic merit and successful community participation".

The bridge was also awarded the 2003 Premio Abcem (ABCEM Award) for "Best Steel Work of the Year, Bridges and Highway Overpasses Category", granted by the Brazilian Metal Construction Association (Associação Brasileira da Construção Metálica, ABCEM).

References

External links

 Photo 360° of JK Bridge - GUIABSB
 International Bridge Conference Award Winners
 Associação Brasileira da Construção Metálica
 Satellite picture on Google Maps
 Night photo showing pedestrian / bike path
 Daytime photo
 Interview with architect Alexandre Chan

Bridges in Brazil
Through arch bridges
Bridges completed in 2002
Buildings and structures in Brasília